The NCAA Division I Men's Outdoor Track and Field Championship is an annual collegiate outdoor track and field competition for men organised by the National Collegiate Athletic Association (NCAA). Athlete's individual performances earn points for their institution and the team with the most points receives the NCAA team title in track and field. A separate NCAA Division I women's competition is also held. These two events are separate from the NCAA Division I Men's Indoor Track and Field Championships and NCAA Division I Women's Indoor Track and Field Championships held during the winter.

The first edition of the championship was held in 1921 and the competition expanded to two divisions in 1963, then three divisions in 1974. Teams and their athletes must abide by NCAA rules in order to compete – the Arkansas Razorbacks were stripped of their 2004 and 2005 titles for recruitment violations, while Florida State University lost its 2007 NCAA Division I title because one of its athletes had not met the academic requirements.

Events

Track events

Sprint events
100 meter dash (1921–present)
200 meter dash (1921–present)
400 meter dash (1921–present)
Distance events
800 meter run (1921–present)
1,500 meter run (1921–present)
3,000 meter steeplechase (1948–present)
5,000 meter run (1959–present)
10,000 meter run (1948–present)
Hurdle Events
110 meter hurdles (1921–present)
400 meter intermediate hurdles (1921–present)
Relay events
400 meter relay (1964–present)
1,600 meter relay (1964–present)

Field events

Jumping events
High jump (1921–present)
Pole vault (1921–present)
Long jump (1921–present)
Triple jump (1932–present)
Throwing events
Shot put (1921–present)
Discus throw (1921–present)
Hammer throw (1921–present)
Javelin throw (1921–present)
Multi-events
Decathlon (1970–present)

Discontinued events
Discontinued events
Two-mile run (1921–1958)
220 yard low hurdles (1921–1959)

Team Champions

The 1925, 1926, and 1927 championships were all awarded unofficially.
Arkansas was forced to vacate the NCAA titles in 2004 and 2005 because of recruiting violations. The titles have not been awarded to any other school.
Florida State was forced to vacate the 2007 NCAA title due to academic violations by one of its athletes.

Appearances

This list consists of the top twenty-five men's college outdoor track and field teams in terms of appearances in the NCAA Men's Division I Outdoor Track and Field Championship.

Titles

Team titles

Individual titles
List updated through the 2012 Championships; top 15 teams only.

Championships records

Event records

Career records
Individual champions from one team, year: 7
Ohio State (1936)
Individual titles, year: 4
Jesse Owens, Ohio State (1935, 1936)
Individual titles, career: 8
Jesse Owens, Ohio State (1935–36)
Individual titles, event: 4
Steve Prefontaine, Oregon (Three-mile run, 1970–73)
Scott Neilson, Washington (Hammer throw, 1976–79)
Suleiman Nyambui, UTEP (10,000 meter run, 1979–82)
Balázs Kiss, USC (Hammer throw, 1993–96)

Notes

See also
NCAA Men's Outdoor Track and Field Championship (Division II, Division III)
NCAA Women's Outdoor Track and Field Championship (Division I, Division II, Division III)
NCAA Men's Indoor Track and Field Championship (Division I, Division II, Division III)
NCAA Women's Indoor Track and Field Championships (Division I, Division II, Division III)
Pre-NCAA Outdoor Track and Field Champions

References

External links
NCAA Division I men's outdoor track and field

 NCAA Men's Division I Outdoor Track and Field Championships
 Outdoor
Track Outdoor
Track